Psychrophrynella is a genus of frogs in the family Strabomantidae The genus is distributed on the Andes of southern Peru and Bolivia. One of the four species assessed by the International Union for Conservation of Nature (IUCN) is assessed as "Critically Endangered".

The name Psychrophrynella is a contraction of the Greek  meaning cold and phrynos meaning toad, with the Greek diminutive suffix ella. It refers to their relatively cold habitats.

Description
Species of the genus Psychrophrynella are small frogs measuring between  snout–vent length. They are characterized by narrow head, absence of differentiated tympanic membrane (except in Psychrophrynella boettgeri) and, in most species, absence of tympanic annulus. Dorsum is smooth, granular, or shagreen. Venter is finely granular, granular, or coarsely granular (but smooth in Psychrophrynella pinguis).

Species
The following species are recognised in the genus Psychrophrynella:

References

 
Strabomantidae
Amphibians of South America
Amphibian genera
Taxa named by Stephen Blair Hedges
Taxa named by William Edward Duellman